Local elections (Indonesian: Pemilihan Kepala Daerah or Pilkada) were held in Indonesia on 27 June 2018. Voters elected 17 governors, 39 mayors and 115 regents across the country. The elections included gubernatorial elections for Indonesia's four most populous provinces: West Java, East Java, Central Java and North Sumatra.

Like other local elections in Indonesia (except for Jakarta), the elections followed a simple plurality, first-past-the-post system where the candidates with the most votes automatically wins the seat even if they have less than 50% of the votes.

Background
Simultaneous local elections (Pilkada Serentak) was first held in Indonesia on 2015. Another one was held in 2017, making the 2018 election the third simultaneous regional elections to be held in the country. The next set of regional elections are set to be held in 2020 and 2024, the latter one being simultaneous with the presidential and legislative elections. It is also planned that regional offices with elections in 2017 and 2018 are to be held by centrally appointed officials starting from the end of their five-year terms until the 2024 elections.

It has been described as a run-up to the 2019 national elections, due to the fact that the three most populous provinces in the country (West Java, East Java and Central Java) hosting 48 percent of voters in 2014 are to vote, with the elections covering 31 provinces altogether. 152 million of the country's 260 million citizens were eligible to vote in the elections. Some observers also described the election as a follow-up to the 2017 elections, particularly the Jakartan election where Gerindra and PKS-backed Anies Baswedan defeated Basuki Tjahaja Purnama, commonly seen as president Joko Widodo's ally. The Indonesian National Police identified several provinces as being prone to conflicts arising from the results of the elections, namely North Sumatra, West Java, East Java, South Sulawesi, and Papua.

Schedule
Preparations of the elections began in 2017, with the KPU receiving demographic data by 31 July 2017 and forming local committees by October. Finalization of the voter list was done by 31 December 2017 and registration for candidates opened the following day, closing at 10 January. For regions where only a single candidate were registered, 3 additional days were allocated between the 14 and 16 January 2018 for extended registration. The campaigning period was to officially start on 15 February 2018 and end by 24 June. The actual voting took place on 27 June.

According to the KPU, the election would cost an estimated Rp 10.5 trillion (USD 735 million). The day of the election (27 June) was made into a national holiday by the government on 25 June.

Elections

Gubernatorial

Note: name in italics indicate incumbents who ran for re-election

Mayoral

Regent

 Aceh

 North Sumatera

 Riau

 Jambi

 South Sumatera

 Bangka Belitung Islands

 Lampung

 Banten

 West Java

 Central Java

 East Java

 Bali

 West Nusa Tenggara

 East Nusa Tenggara

 West Kalimantan

 Central Kalimantan

 South Kalimantan

 East Kalimantan

 North Sulawesi

 Central Sulawesi

 West Sulawesi

 South Sulawesi

 Southeast Sulawesi

 Maluku

 Papua

Gallery

Notes

References

External links 
 KPU page

 
2018 elections in Indonesia
2018
Indonesia politics-related lists